The Australian Film Institute Award for Best Lead Actress in Television Drama is awarded annually by the Australian Film Institute as part of the awards in television for excellence in acting in television drama by an actress.

The first Award was made in 1986. Prior to 1990, two awards existed and were called Best Performance by an Actress in a Mini Series and Best Lead Actress in a Telefeature. The awards were merged in 1990 to become Best Actress in a Leading Role in a Telefeature or Mini Series which in 1991 was renamed Best Actress in a Leading Role in a Television Drama. In 2000, the Awards were again awarded in two categories, called Best Performance by an Actress in a Telefeature or Mini Series and Best Actress in a Leading Role in a Television Drama. In 2002, the Awards were again combined under the title Best Actress in a Leading Role in a Television Drama and two years later, in 2004, the Award was named Best Actress in a Leading Role in a Television Drama or Comedy.  A separate comedy Award was established in 2006, and this Award became Best Lead Actress in Television Drama.

Best Performance by an Actress in a Mini Series

Best Lead Actress in a Telefeature

Best Actress in a Leading Role in a Telefeature or Mini Series

Best Actress in a Leading Role in a Television Drama

Best Performance by an Actress in a Telefeature or Mini Series

Best Actress in a Leading Role in a Television Drama or Comedy

Best Lead Actress in Television Drama

See also
 Australian Film Institute
 AFI Awards
 Australian Film Institute Television Awards

References

AACTA Awards
Australian Film Institute Awards
Best Lead Actress in Television Drama
Television awards for Best Actress